The Women's time trial of the 2012 UCI Road World Championships cycling event took place on 18 September 2012 in and around Valkenburg, Netherlands.

Judith Arndt of Germany defended successfully her world time trial title. The 36-year-old, who retired at the end of the championships, completed the hilly course in a time of 32 minutes 26 seconds to beat former teammate Evelyn Stevens of the United States by 33 seconds. Stevens had been the seventh last to start, and her time of 33 minutes dead took the lead from  teammate Ellen van Dijk of the Netherlands. Second last to go, as the previous year's silver medallist, New Zealand's Linda Villumsen, Arndt's Orica–AIS teammate, came closest to unseating the American, but crossed the line in 33’07", which was only good enough for provisional second place, ahead of 2010 champion Emma Pooley of Great Britain. As defending champion Arndt set off last and, after setting the fastest time at both intermediate checkpoints, powered up the final Cauberg climb and sprinted to the finish to push Stevens off the top step of the podium, and Pooley out of the medals altogether.

Final classification

References

External links

Women's time trial
UCI Road World Championships – Women's time trial
2012 in women's road cycling